John Joseph Kain (May 31, 1841 – October 13, 1903) was an American prelate of the Roman Catholic Church.  He served as bishop of the Diocese of Wheeling in West Virginia from 1875 to 1893 and as archbishop of the Archdiocese of Saint Louis from 1896 to 1903.  Kain was the first native-born American to be appointed archbishop of St. Louis.

Biography

Early life 
Kain was born in Martinsburg in what was then Virginia on May 31, 1841, to Jeremiah and Ellen Kain. After graduating from St. Charles College in Catonsville, Maryland, in 1862, he enrolled at St. Mary's College in Baltimore, Maryland.

Kain was ordained to the priesthood by Archbishop Martin John Spalding  on July 7, 1866, for the Diocese of Wheeling. After his ordination, Kain was stationed in Harper's Ferry, West Virginia, where he served parishioners in eight West Virginia counties and four Virginia counties. During his time there, he restored churches in Harper's Ferry and Martinsburg, and rebuilt churches in Winchester, Virginia and Berkeley Springs, West Virginia that had been destroyed during the American Civil War.

Kain's sister, Mary Josephine Kain, served as a Catholic sister in Wheeling, West Virginia. Another sister, Margaret Kain, worked as his housekeeper for most of his career.

Bishop of Wheeling 
Pope Pius IX appointed Kain as bishop of the Diocese of Wheeling on February 12, 1875.  He was consecrated at the Cathedral of Saint Joseph in Wheeling by Archbishop James Bayley on May 23, 1875. During this period, Kain had about 36 priests under his jurisdiction who were ministering to approximately 20,000 Catholics.

Coadjutor Archbishop and Archbishop of St. Louis 
In May, 1893, Pope Leo XIII appointed Kain as coadjutor archbishop to assist Archbishop Peter Kenrick of the archdiocese of Saint Louis, and created a titular archbishop the next month.  When Kenrick died on June 8, 1895, Kain automatically succeeded him as Archbishop. 

John Kain died on October 13, 1903, in St. Agnes' Sanitarium in Baltimore after a long illness. He was 62 years old. He was interred in Calvary Cemetery in Saint Louis, Missouri.Kain is the namesake for Rosati-Kain High School in St. Louis.

References

Sources
 Who Was Who in America, Vol. I:1897-1942.  Chicago:The A.N. Marquis Company, 1942.

External links
 
  retrieved July 13, 2006

1841 births
1903 deaths
19th-century Roman Catholic archbishops in the United States
20th-century Roman Catholic archbishops in the United States
Roman Catholic archbishops of St. Louis
Roman Catholic bishops of Wheeling–Charleston
Clergy from St. Louis
People from Wheeling, West Virginia
Roman Catholic Archdiocese of St. Louis
St. Mary's Seminary and University alumni
People from Catonsville, Maryland
Burials at Calvary Cemetery (St. Louis)
Catholics from Maryland
Religious leaders from Martinsburg, West Virginia